The women's 400 metres at the 2017 World Championships in Athletics was held at the London Olympic Stadium on  and 9 August.

Summary
In wet conditions, Shaunae Miller-Uibo took an early lead, which she maintained coming onto the home stretch, with Allyson Felix in second and Phyllis Francis and Salwa Eid Naser gaining on both of them. Miller-Uibo stumbled and slowed to a jog, being passed by Francis, Felix, and Nasser. Francis continued on to win while Nasser, breaking her own national record, dipped past Felix on the line.

Records
Before the competition records were as follows:

The following records were set at the competition:

Qualification standard
The standard to qualify automatically for entry was 52.10.

Schedule
The event schedule, in local time (UTC+1), is as follows:

Results

Heats
The first round took place on 6 August in six heats as follows:

The first three in each heat ( Q ) and the next six fastest ( q ) qualified for the semifinals. The overall results were as follows:

Semifinals
The semifinals took place on 7 August in three heats as follows:

The first two in each heat ( Q ) and the next two fastest ( q ) qualified for the final. The overall results were as follows:

Final
The final took place on 9 August at 21:50. The results were as follows: (photo finish)

References

400
400 metres at the World Athletics Championships
Women's sport in London